James Turner, 1st Baron Netherthorpe (6 January 1908 – 8 November 1980), was a British peer.

Turner was the son of Albert Edward Mann Turner of Anston, Yorkshire. He served as President of the National Farmers Union from 1945 to 1960 and was also President of the Royal Association of British Dairy Farmers and of the Royal Agricultural Society. He was knighted in 1949 and in 1959 he was raised to the peerage as Baron Netherthorpe, of Anston in the West Riding of the County of York.

Lord Netherthorpe died in November 1980, aged 72, and was succeeded in the barony by his eldest son James.

References

Kidd, Charles, Williamson, David (editors). Debrett's Peerage and Baronetage (1990 edition). New York: St Martin's Press, 1990.

1908 births
1980 deaths
Hereditary barons created by Elizabeth II